North Moat Mountain is a mountain located in Carroll County, New Hampshire. 
North Moat is flanked to the south by Middle Moat Mountain, and to the west by Big Attitash Mountain.

North Moat Mountain stands within the watershed of the upper Saco River, which drains into the Gulf of Maine at Saco, Maine. The northwest side of North Moat Mtn. drains into Lucy Brook, thence into the Saco River.
The east side of North Moat drains into Moat Brook, thence into the Saco. The southwest side of North Moat drains into Deer Brook, thence into the Swift River, a tributary of the Saco.

See also 

 List of mountains in New Hampshire
 White Mountain National Forest

Notes

External links 
 
  PeakBagger.com: North Moat Mountain

Mountains of New Hampshire
Mountains of Carroll County, New Hampshire